Global Warning is the third studio album by Canadian hip hop group Rascalz, released in 1999 on ViK. Recordings.

Track listing
 "Global Warning" - 1:03
 "High Noon" - 4:21
 "Priceless" (featuring Esthero) - 4:33
 "Can't Relate" (featuring JuJu & Psycho Les) - 4:24
 "Gametime" - 4:05
 "Population Control" - 3:22
 "Top of the World" (featuring Barrington Levy & K-os) - 4:48
 "Gunnfinga" (featuring Kardinal Offishall) - 4:56
 "For the Rhyme" - 0:40
 "As It Is" (featuring Choclair) - 3:42
 "Fallen" (featuring K-os) - 4:24
 "C-IV" - 3:55
 "Where You At" (featuring KRS-One) - 3:40
 "Area 51" - 5:40
 "On the Run" - 3:50
 "Témoin" (featuring Muzion) - 4:44
 "Bordaline" (featuring Concise & Sazon Diamante) - 4:16
 "Lab Rat Produce" - 1:05
 "Sharpshooter (Best of the Best)" (featuring Bret "Hitman" Hart) - 3:53
 "Blessings" - 1:24

Charts

References

See also
Kalamazoo, Michigan

1999 albums
Albums produced by the Alchemist (musician)
Rascalz albums